Cornwells Heights may refer to:
Cornwells Heights, Pennsylvania, census-designated place in United States
Cornwells Heights (SEPTA station), rail station in Philadelphia, Pennsylvania, United States
Cornwells Heights-Eddington, Pennsylvania, census-designated place in United States